Orthophytum (Greek "ortho" = straight and "phytum" = plant) is a genus in the plant family Bromeliaceae, subfamily Bromelioideae.

Distribution
All the species of the bromeliad genus are endemic to the Atlantic Forest biome (Mata Atlantica Brasileira), located in southeast Brazil.

Species are found in the Brazilian states of Alagoas, Bahia, Espírito Santo, Minas Gerais, Paraíba, and/or Pernambuco.

Due to recent advances in technology and DNA testing many of the original Orthophytum species and cultivars have been reclassified under new genera.

Species 
, Plants of the World Online accepted the following species:

Orthophytum alagoanum Leme & A.P.Fontana
Orthophytum alvimii W.Weber
Orthophytum arcanum Leme
Orthophytum argenteum Louzada & Wand.
Orthophytum atalaiense J.A.Siqueira & Leme
Orthophytum benzingii Leme & H.Luther
Orthophytum boudetianum Leme & L.Kollmann
Orthophytum braunii Leme
Orthophytum brejoense Leme, E.H.Souza & Vidigal
Orthophytum buranhense Leme & A.P.Fontana
Orthophytum catingae Leme
Orthophytum cearense Leme & F.J.S.Monteiro
Orthophytum compactum L.B.Sm.
Orthophytum conquistense Leme & M.Machado
Orthophytum cristaliense Leme
Orthophytum diamantinense Leme
Orthophytum disjunctum L.B.Sm.
Orthophytum duartei L.B.Sm.
Orthophytum eddie-estevesii Leme
Orthophytum elegans Leme
Orthophytum erigens Leme
Orthophytum estevesii (Rauh) Leme
Orthophytum falconii Leme
Orthophytum foliosum L.B.Sm.
Orthophytum formosense Leme
Orthophytum fosterianum L.B.Sm.
Orthophytum glabrum (Mez) Mez
Orthophytum gouveianum Leme & O.B.C.Ribeiro
Orthophytum graomogolense Leme & C.C.Paula
Orthophytum grossiorum Leme & C.C.Paula
Orthophytum guaratingense Leme & L.Kollmann
Orthophytum gurkenii Hutchison
Orthophytum harleyi Leme & M.Machado
Orthophytum horridum Leme
Orthophytum jabrense Baracho & J.A.Siqueira
Orthophytum jacaraciense Leme
Orthophytum lanuginosum Leme & C.C.Paula
Orthophytum lemei E.Pereira & I.A.Penna
Orthophytum leprosum (Mez) Mez
Orthophytum lucidum Leme & H.Luther
Orthophytum lymanianum E.Pereira & I.A.Penna
Orthophytum macroflorum Leme & M.Machado
Orthophytum magalhaesii L.B.Sm.
Orthophytum maracasense L.B.Sm.
Orthophytum mello-barretoi L.B.Sm.
Orthophytum minimum Leme & O.B.C.Ribeiro
Orthophytum piranianum Leme & C.C.Paula
Orthophytum pseudostoloniferum Leme & L.Kollmann
Orthophytum pseudovagans Leme & L.Kollmann
Orthophytum riocontense Leme
Orthophytum roseolilacinum Leme
Orthophytum rubiginosum Leme
Orthophytum rubrum L.B.Sm.
Orthophytum sanctum L.B.Sm.
Orthophytum santaritense Leme, S.Heller & Zizka
Orthophytum santosianum Leme
Orthophytum saxicola (Ule) L.B.Sm.
Orthophytum schulzianum Leme & M.Machado
Orthophytum striatifolium Leme & L.Kollmann
Orthophytum sucrei H.Luther
Orthophytum teofilo-otonense Leme & L.Kollmann
Orthophytum toscanoi Leme
Orthophytum triunfense J.A.Siqueira & Leme
Orthophytum vagans M.B.Foster
Orthophytum vasconcelosianum Leme
Orthophytum viridissimum Leme
Orthophytum zanonii Leme

Transferred
Species transferred to other genera include:
Orthophytum albopictum Philcox → Sincoraea albopicta
Orthophytum amoenum (Ule) L.B.Sm. → Sincoraea amoena
Orthophytum burle-marxii L.B.Sm. & R.W. Read → Sincoraea burle-marxii
Orthophytum hatschbachii Leme → Sincoraea hatschbachii
Orthophytum heleniceae Leme → Sincoraea heleniceae
Orthophytum humile L.B.Sm. → Sincoraea humilis
Orthophytum itambense (Versieux & Leme) Louzada & Versieux → Lapanthus itambensis
Orthophytum mucugense Wanderley & Conceição → Sincoraea mucugensis
Orthophytum navioides (L.B.Sm.) L.B.Sm. → Sincoraea navioides

Selected cultivars and hybrids
Cultivars and hybrids cultivated as ornamental plants include:

 Orthophytum 'Andrea'
 Orthophytum 'Blaze'
 Orthophytum 'Brunswick'
 Orthophytum 'Clouds'
 Orthophytum 'Copper Penny'
 Orthophytum 'Donna Shaw'
 Orthophytum 'Iron Ore'
 Orthophytum 'Ivory Tower'
 Orthophytum 'Milagres'
 Orthophytum 'Mother Lode'
 Orthophytum 'Stardust'
 Orthophytum 'Starlights'
 Orthophytum 'Stellar Beauty'
 Orthophytum 'Warana'
 Orthophytum 'Warren Loose'

References

External links
 FCBS.org: Orthophytum bromeliad photos index

 
Endemic flora of Brazil
Flora of the Atlantic Forest
Flora of Alagoas
Flora of Bahia
Flora of Espírito Santo
Flora of Minas Gerais
Flora of Paraíba
Flora of Pernambuco
Garden plants of South America
Bromeliaceae genera